Staroyashevo (İśke Yäş) is a rural locality (a village) in Staroyashevsky Selsoviet, Kaltasinsky District, Bashkortostan, Russia. The population was 221 as of 2010. There are 5 streets.

Geography 
Staroyashevo is located 44 km east of Kaltasy (the district's administrative centre) by road. Bratovshchina is the nearest rural locality.

References 

Rural localities in Kaltasinsky District